

Storms
Note:  indicates the name was retired after that usage in the respective basin
 Walding
 1965 – caused heavy rains 98 people were killed and 9 were missing due to the resulting flooding and landslides.
 1977 – a powerful category 4 typhoon that changed course before reaching the coast of the Philippines.
 1981 – a category 2 typhoon that passed off the coast of Japan.
 1989 – an intense typhoon in the Philippine Sea.
 1993 – a Category 3 typhoon that made landfall in southern China.

 Waldo
 1985 – struck western Mexico and later brought heavy rainfall to the central United States, killing one person.
 1998 – tropical storm that hit Japan.

 Wali (2014) – remained southeast of Hawaii.
 Wallie (1965) – struck southern Mexico.
 Wally
 1976 – formed, moved offshore, and later dissipated over Western Australia.
 1980 – killed 18 people when it struck Fiji.

 Walt
 1991 – intense typhoon that passed northeast of Luzon.
 1994 – moved across southwestern Japan.

 Walter
 1990 – tropical cyclone in central Indian Ocean, which was renamed Gregoara upon crossing 90º E.
 2001 – passed near Christmas Island and the Cocos Islands.

 Waka (2001) – one of the most damaging tropical cyclones to hit the island of Tonga in the South Pacific.

 Wanda
 1945 – tropical storm that moved from the Philippines through the South China Sea.
 1951 – typhoon that moved through the Philippines, killing 82.
 1956 – typhoon that killed over 4,000 people in China.
 1959 – short-lived storm east of Hawaii.
 1962 – the most intense tropical cyclone on record in Hong Kong.
 1965 – April typhoon that dissipated near Palau.
 1967 – slow-moving typhoon that passed east of Japan.
 1971 – struck Vietnam, killing 56 people and grounding air operations in the ongoing war.
 1974 (January) – tropical storm that remained northeast of the Philippines.
 1974 (January) – tropical storm that struck near Brisbane, Australia, killing 16 people.
 1977 – short-lived tropical storm south of Japan.
 2021 – a weak storm that meandered in the open Atlantic; developed from an extratropical nor'easter that affected much of the Northeastern United States.

 Ward
 1992 – developed in the central Pacific Ocean and remained away from landmasses.
 1995 – intense typhoon that passed south of Japan.
 2009 – a weak cyclonic storm that struck Sri Lanka.

 Warling
 1971 – a Category 1 Typhoon that struck Taiwan causing severe flooding in Taipei.
 1979 – the most intense tropical cyclone ever recorded with a minimum pressure of 870 mb. Tip also remains the largest tropical cyclone worldwide, with a wind diameter up to 1,380 miles (2,220 km) across. Tip weakened to a Category 1 typhoon before making landfall in Japan, killing nearly 100 people.
 1983 – killed 170 people when it drifted off the eastern Philippines, mostly related to the sinking of the MV Dona Cassandra.
 1991 – crossed the central Philippines.

 Warren
 1981 – struck Hainan Island and Vietnam.
 1984 – meandered in the South China Sea due to the larger Typhoon Vanessa.
 1988 – struck southeastern China, where it destroyed 13,000 homes and killed 17.
 1995 – struck Australia's Northern Territory.

 Wasa (1991) – powerful cyclone that left heavy damage in French Polynesia, later renamed Arthur.

 Washi
 2005 – struck Hainan and Vietnam.
 2011 – a late-season tropical cyclone that caused around 1,200 to 1,500 deaths and catastrophic damage in the Philippines in late 2011.

 Wati (2006) – approached and moved southeastward away from the east coast of Australia.

 Watorea (1976) – moved along the east coast of Australia.

 Wayne
 1979 – dissipated over Luzon.
 1983 – typhoon that killed 137 when it bypassed Luzon and Taiwan before striking southeastern China.
 1986 – lasted 22 days around the South China Sea, killing 490 in adjacent land masses.
 1989 – typhoon that struck Japan, killing 7.

 Weling
 1978 –  crossed the Philippines and later struck southern China.
 1982 – a destructive typhoon that moved through Vietnam and the Philippines during October 1982.
 1986 –  passed northeast of Luzon.
 1994 – brushed northern Luzon before crossing Hainan and Vietnam.

 Welming (1967) – the second super Typhoon to hit the Philippines just 2 weeks after Typhoon Carla.

 Welpring
 1964 – moved across Japan
 1976 – an intense typhoon that recurved northeast of the Philippines.
 1980 – passed south of Japan
 1984 – meandered off the east coast of the Philippines.
 1988 – developed over the Philippines and struck southern Vietnam.
 2000 – PAGASA name for Typhoon Soulik, which lasted until early January 2001.

 Wendy
 1957 – crossed northern Luzon and southeastern China, killing 16.
 1960 – struck the Japanese island of Shikoku as a typhoon.
 1963 – hit Taiwan and eastern China.
 1965 – passed southeast of Japan.
 1968 – passed south of Taiwan and Hong Kong before striking southern China in Guangdong.
 1971 – passed east of Japan before dissipating over the Kamkatchka Peninsula
 1972 – a powerful cyclone that passed near Solomon Islands and New Caledonia.
 1974 – drifted near Luzon and Taiwan.
 1978 – typhoon that crossed Okinawa and later Kyushu.
 1999 – deadly tropical storm that killed 133 when it brushed Luzon and struck Guangdong in southern China.

 Wene (2000) – crossed from the western Pacific into the central Pacific as a tropical storm.

 Weng (2003) – crossed the Philippines and dissipated over Hainan, killing 13 people.

 Wening
 1966 – dissipated north of Luzon.
 1970 – crossed southern Luzon before dissipating over the South China Sea off the Vietnamese coast.
 1974 – a category 2 typhoon hitting northern Luzon.

 Wes (1998) – killed 10 people while moving near French Polynesia.

 Wila (1988) – short-lived tropical storm southeast of Hawaii.

 Wilda
 1955 – developed near the Marshall Islands and remained east of Guam.
 1959 – struck southern China and South Korea as a tropical depression.
 1961 – brought flooding rains to eastern Vietnam.
 1964 – killed 42 people when it struck Japan as a typhoon.
 1967 – remained east of the Philippines.
 1970 – typhoon that killed 11 people when it struck the Japanese island of Kyushu.
 1973 – developed over Luzon and hit southeastern China in Fujian.
 1976 – hit western Japan.
 1991 – moved across the Philippines.
 1994 – remained east of Guam and Japan.

 Wilf (1979) – formed southwest of Indonesia, and was renamed Tropical Cyclone Danitza upon crossing 90º E.

 Wilfred (2020) – formed south of the Cabo Verde Islands, and remained out to sea.

 Willa
 1962 – short-lived tropical storm west of Mexico.
 1988 – formed well to the southeast of the Hawaiian Islands, never threatened land.
 2018 – a powerful tropical cyclone that brought torrential rains and destructive winds to southwestern Mexico, particularly the states of Sinaloa and Nayarit, during late-October 2018.

 William
 1983 – formed near French Polynesia.
 1995 – damaging cyclone in the Cook Islands and French Polynesia.

 Willy
 1984 – formed and dissipated west of Australia.
 1994 – passed near Cocos Islands.
 2005 – developed and dissipated off Western Australia.

 Wilma
 1952 – downed a plane over the Philippines.
 1975 – tropical storm that struck the Kimberley region of Western Australia.
 2005 – strongest Atlantic hurricane on record by pressure; caused $29.4 billion in damage along its path from the Caribbean to Florida in October 2005.
 2011 – only known tropical cyclone to hit New Zealand, where it caused flooding damage
 2013 – long-lived tropical depression that moved from the Philippines, across Indochina and southern India, before dissipating over the Arabian Sea.

 Wini (1987) – left heavy damage when it passed near the Samoas.

 Winifred
 1986 – one of the worst tropical cyclones to make landfall in northern Queensland on record. 
 1992 – made landfall southeast of Manzanillo, Colima, causing minor damage.

 Winnie
 1953 – remained northeast of Guam.
 1958 – killed 31 people while crossing Taiwan.
 1961 – struck Bangladesh, killing 11,468 people.
 1964 – crossed the Philippines and Hainan, killing around 100 people.
 1966 – hit Japan and South Korea as a tropical storm.
 1969 – dissipated between Luzon and Taiwan.
 1972 – hit eastern China as a tropical storm.
 1975 – typhoon that remained east of Japan.
 1978 (March) – cyclone off the west coast of Australia.
 1978 (November) – tropical storm that passed of Guam.
 1983 – the only December Pacific hurricane on record, which stalled off the southwest coast of Mexico.
 1997 – long-tracked typhoon that killed 372 people when it passed north of Taiwan and moved ashore in Zhejiang.
 2004 – weak but deadly tropical depression that moved across the Philippines, killing at least 842 people.

 Winona
 1982 – killed people while crossing Luzon.
 1985 – damaged 7,500 houses in southeastern China.
 1989 – rare January Central Pacific storm that crossed much of the Pacific Ocean.
 1990 – developed from the remnants of Tropical Storm Tasha, and later struck Japan.
 1993 – moved across the Philippines and South China Sea.

 Winsome (2001) – killed two people when it struck Australia's Northern Territory.

 Winston (2016) – strongest storm to hit Fiji on record, leaving 44 fatalities and US$1.6 billion in damage.

 Wipha
 2007 – passed just north of Taiwan before striking Zhejiang, leaving US$1.3 billion in damage.
 2013 – struck southeastern Japan, killing 41 people.
 2013 – a large typhoon that caused extensive damage in Japan in mid-October 2013.
 2019 – caused significant damages in Vietnam and China.

 Wukong
 2000 – struck Hainan and northern Vietnam.
 2006 – tropical storm that dropped torrential rainfall across Japan, killing two.
 2012 – moved across the Philippines on Christmas Day, killing 20 people.
 2018 – a severe tropical storm that never made landfall.

 Wutip
 2001 – intense typhoon south of Japan.
 2007 – weak, sprawling tropical storm that killed 10 people.
 2013 – typhoon that struck eastern Vietnam, killing 65 people.
 2019 – category 5 typhoon that cost $3 million in damage.

 Wynne
1980 – strongest typhoon of the season, passed through Ryukyu Islands twice.
 1984 – passed between Taiwan and Luzon before striking China, killed three fishermen on Luzon.
 1987 – typhoon that weakened while passing east of Japan.

See also
 Tropical cyclone naming
 List of historical tropical cyclone names

References

W